Stakesby may refer to -

Places
Stakesby, North Yorkshire
High Stakesby, North Yorkshire

Ships
, a number of ships with this name
 – launched at Whitby and foundered 1846